Mientras no cueste trabajo (in English: While No Trouble) is Asturian pop singer Melendi's third studio album.

The disc includes the song Arriba Extremoduro, which was an homage that Extremaduran group, and though it isn't a remake, it does sample the song La vereda de la puerta de atrás.

In 2007, it was rereleased with four new songs: Firmes, El rey de la baraja, La aceituna and Me gusta el fútbol.

Track listing 

 Kisiera Yo Saber
 Por amarte tanto
 Calle la pantomima
 Mientras no cueste trabajo
 Quiero ser feliz
 Andadas
 Volantes pa la falda mi gitana
 Mesías de Vallecas
 Porque tú no eres un coche
 Loco
 Echarte a suertes
 Arriba Extremoduro
 El tiempo que gasto
 De bar en peor
 Zoociedad
 Gangs of London

Melendi albums
2006 albums